Royal Township may refer to:

 Royal Township, White County, Arkansas, in White County, Arkansas
 Royal Township, Ford County, Kansas
 Royal Township, Lincoln County, Minnesota
 Royal Township, Antelope County, Nebraska
 Royal Township, Ramsey County, North Dakota, in Ramsey County, North Dakota

Township name disambiguation pages